Tom Giffard is a Welsh Conservative politician who has served as Member of the Senedd (MS) for the region of South Wales West since 2021.

Key interests and achievements

Tom has a keen interest and background in education, having worked as a Learning Support Assistant in a Welsh Language primary school. He also chaired the Bridgend County Borough Council Education Scrutiny Committee, overseeing and scrutinising the council's multi-million pound education budget. Tom also has a keen interest in the structures and development of local government as he has been a Council Group Leader in Bridgend for 4 years.

Personal history

Tom grew up both in Penllergaer, Swansea and Ammanford, Carmarthenshire as his parents were separated. Graduating from Swansea University with a BA in History and Politics in 2013, Tom then continued to live in Swansea for a number of years before moving to Bridgend in 2016. Upon Tom's election to the Senedd he was appointed by the leader of the Welsh Conservatives, Andrew RT Davies, to serve in the Shadow Cabinet. Tom currently holds the position of Shadow Minister for Culture, Tourism & Sport.

Tom also sits on the Senedd's Culture, Communications, Welsh Language, Sport and International Relations Committee.

Professional background

Tom, who is a second language Welsh speaker, has held various roles during his professional life, firstly becoming a Learning Support Assistant in a Welsh Language primary school. He then went on to complete his studies at Swansea University. Upon his graduation, he then went on to work as a Community Liaison Officer within his region of South Wales West before organising campaigns and working with volunteers in both Swansea and Bridgend. Prior to his election as a Member of the Senedd for South Wales West, Tom held the position of Office Manager for the Bridgend Member of Parliament, Jamie Wallis

Political history

Before his election to the Senedd in 2021, Tom was elected to the Brackla ward as a Bridgend County Borough Councillor in 2017, where he led the Conservative Group on the Council until his election to the Senedd in 2021.

Prior to his election to the Senedd he was the leader of the Conservative group on the Bridgend County Borough Council. During his time as leader of the group he was required to suspend a fellow Conservative councillor for allegedly posting and sharing Islamophobic material on social media.

References

Living people
Conservative Party members of the Senedd
Wales MSs 2021–2026
People educated at Ysgol Tre-Gib
1991 births